is a type of Japanese pottery that is a form of Kyō ware from Kyoto.

It is related to other Kyō wares such as Mizoro ware and Kiyomizu ware, but denotes the kiln it originates from. The origin lies in the Awataguchi area of Kyoto. Awata kilns also produced Satsuma ware at one point.

References

External links  
 
 http://www.awatayaki.com/

Culture in Kyoto Prefecture
Japanese pottery